Westerholt Power Station was a coal fired power station in Gelsenkirchen-Westerholt, Germany. The power plant consisted of two units built in the 1960s, each capable of producing 150 MW of electricity. Its smokestack, built in 1981, was 337 metres (1106 feet) tall, making it Germany's tallest chimney at the time.

The power station was decommissioned on May 13, 2005 and the chimney demolished on Sunday, December 3, 2006, at 10:53 a.m. It remains the tallest freestanding structure of any type to ever be demolished in a controlled manner. The only taller structures to ever be demolished in any manner(uncontrolled) being the two towers of the World Trade Center.

It was the tallest structure in North Rhine-Westphalia. Before its erection the 320.8 m tall Wesel transmitter tower took this claim. After the demolition of the chimney, the Wesel tower once again became the tallest structure in North Rhine-Westphalia.

A district heating plant, "FWK Westerholt", has been in operation on this site since the spring of 2004. There are six boilers there to provide heat for the district heating network of the northern Ruhr Area.

The Westerholt coal mine is located only a few hundred metres away. Both the power plant and the mine are on the city limits of Gelsenkirchen in the Hassel neighborhood and were named for the contiguous (and at that time still independent) city of Westerholt in what was then the district of Recklinghausen (today the city is a part of the city of Herten and is named "Herten-Westerholt").

See also

 List of chimneys
 List of tallest demolished freestanding structures
 List of tallest freestanding structures in the world

References

External links
 Photos of Westerholt Power Station 
 
 http://www.skyscraperpage.com/diagrams/?b4758
 

Towers completed in 1981
Coal-fired power stations in Germany
E.ON
Buildings and structures in North Rhine-Westphalia
Chimneys in Germany
Economy of Gelsenkirchen